The La Piedad Institute of Technology is a public university located in La Piedad, Michoacán, Mexico. It was founded in 1990. It is part of the Mexican public education system (SEP) and offers training for several careers. English is taught as a second language at the school.

History 

In 1990 the institute started operations in the buildings of another college, Centro de Bachillerato Tecnológico Industrial y de servicios No. 84, with programmes in Industrial Engineering, Business Administration, Computer Systems Engineering and Informatics.

Several years later it added a course of study for Electronics Engineering. Throughout its 17-year history, students at Tec La Piedad have several times won firsts, seconds and third place prizes at creativity contests, amongst institutes of technology from around the country.

The university has been the venue of regional sports tournaments, where the students took part in basketball, tennis, and soccer.

Academics 

The institute offers a variety of degree programs:

 Electronic Engineering
 Industrial Engineering
 Business Administration
 Computer Systems Engineering
 Informatics

Featured Engineers 

Ing. Miguel Angel Vázquez Jiménez
Ing. Ociel García Padilla

Research publications

Below is a list of published research papers produced by PhD students at the school.
Stray Light in One-cavity Radiation Pyrometers
Corrections of size-of-source effect and distance effect in radiometric measurements of radiance
An embedded language approach to router specification in Curry
An Embedded Language Approach to Router Specification in Curry (Book )
Numerical calculation of the Fresnel diffraction patterns for periodic objects in measurements with a two-aperture radiometer
Hardness measurements of metals with the complex refractive index
Mathematics I. Differential Calculation (in Spanish)

External links
Official Website (in Spanish) Including address and career information.

Universities and colleges in Michoacán
Educational institutions established in 1990
1990 establishments in Mexico